The 2013 Colombian coffee growers strike was a cessation of activities of the Colombian coffee economic sector, carried out with the realization of different mobilizations in several municipalities of the country, and consequently, the blocking of roads and riots between peasants and the Mobile Anti-Disturbance Squadron (ESMAD). The strike began on 25 February 2013, and on 2 March, despite reaching agreements between the government and the representatives of the coffee growers, the strike continued. Finally, on the 8th of the same month, the parties reached an agreement, through which improvements will be recognized to the exercise of coffee growing, and therefore, the end of the strike.

The protests of the coffee growers took place after they considered that the national government was not helping them to face the economic difficulties of the time. According to the farmers, coffee growing, emblematic in Colombia, stopped being a profitable business because production had fallen considerably. For its part, the National Federation of Coffee Growers of Colombia (FEDECAFÉ), the highest body promoting coffee production in the country, at the head of its manager, Luis Genaro Muñoz, together with the National Coffee Committee, expressed strong rejection to the strike, arguing their non-sympathy and suggesting the participation of illegal armed organizations in the events. The President of Colombia, Juan Manuel Santos, and his ministers, apart from agreeing with what FEDECAFÉ and the Committee said, went further, calling the strike unjustified and urging the peasants to "defend the institutionality of the grain".

The strike ended on 8 March after an agreement between both parties.

See also
 Colombian coffee growing axis

References

External links
 Crónica del paro cafetero en Irra, Caldas

2013 in Colombia
2013 protests
Protests in Colombia
Economic history of Colombia
Labor disputes in Colombia
Coffee in Colombia
Agriculture and forestry strikes